Livartzi is a mountain village and a community in the municipal unit of Aroania, Achaea, Greece.  In 2011, it had a population of 164 for the village and 211 for the municipal district, which includes the villages Livadi and Livartzino. Livartzi is situated at 850 m above sea level, in the southeastern foothills of Mount Erymanthos. It is 4 km southwest of Lechouri, 6 km north of Psofida and 21 km southwest of Kalavryta. It is not known when Livartzi was founded, but it existed before the Ottoman rule. In the 19th century, refugees from Mystras settled the area and the population rose to around 3,000 people.

Population

People

Andreas Papagiannakopoulos (1845–1911), politician

See also

List of settlements in Achaea

External links
Livartzi at the GTP Travel Pages

References

Aroania
Populated places in Achaea